The Church of Corpus Christi is a Roman Catholic parish church in the Roman Catholic Archdiocese of New York, located on West 121st Street between Broadway and Amsterdam Avenue in the Morningside Heights section of Manhattan, New York City. The parish was established in 1906. The parish priest is concurrently the Catholic chaplain at the nearby Columbia University.

Buildings
The church, founded by Rev. John H. Dooley, was built in 1906–1907 as a brick and stone chapel and three-storey parish house, all over basement, to designs of F. A. de Meuron of Main Street, Yonkers, New York, for $45,000. The structure was a five-bay three-storey Beaux-arts brick school house with a stone-quoined breakfront occupying the central three bays that contained a temporary church and rectory. The new church, school, and rectory cornerstone was laid on November 11, 1906, and the structure was dedicated June 30, 1907 by Archbishop John Farley.

These buildings were replaced in 1930 with a new church and rectory built 1930 to the designs by Thomas Dunn and Frederick E. Gibson. The current church, school, and convent were dedicated on October 25, 1936. The church was designed in 1935 by Wilfred E. Anthony. The current baptistery survives from F. A. de Meuron's original 1906 church.

Although the classical exterior of the church is not prepossessing, the interior is widely admired. Time Out New York calls it "gorgeous,"  while the AIA Guide to NYC urges passersby to enter and admire a sanctuary that looks as though it was designed by a disciple of Sir Christopher Wren.

The parish school opened in September 1907, staffed by the Sisters of Charity of New York. The Dominican Sisters of Sinsinawa, Wisconsin, were welcomed to the school in 1936.

Notable events
On November 16, 1938, Thomas Merton was baptized at Corpus Christi Church and received Holy Communion.

Further reading
 Flegenheimer, Matt, "‘Carlin Street’ Resisted by His Old Church. Was It Something He Said?", The New York Times, October 25, 2011

References

External links
 Church website

Roman Catholic churches completed in 1930
Christian organizations established in 1906
Roman Catholic churches in Manhattan
Baroque Revival architecture in New York City
Morningside Heights, Manhattan
1906 establishments in New York City
20th-century Roman Catholic church buildings in the United States